Ansar ul Islam is a militant Islamist group active in Burkina Faso and in Mali. It was founded by Boureima Dicko, also known as Ibrahim Malam Dicko, and it is the first native Jihadi group in Burkina Faso. The group cooperates closely with Jama'at Nasr al-Islam wal Muslimin.

History 
The group announced its existence in December 2016 in a statement claiming responsibility for an attack in Nassoumbou.  It was founded and led by Ibrahim Malam Dicko until his death in May 2017 from natural causes.

The group has claimed responsibility for several attacks. These include the attack on two police stations in Tongomayel and Baraboulé in February 2017 and the attack at a village in Soum in March 2017.

On 30 October 2020, about fifty jihadists on motorcycles belonging to the Ansarul Islam group were killed by the French army in Mali, near the border with Burkina Faso. Weapons and equipment were also seized.

See also 

 Jihadist insurgency in Burkina Faso

References

Groups affiliated with al-Qaeda
Islamism in Africa
Organizations based in Africa designated as terrorist
Organisations designated as terrorist by Pakistan
Rebel groups in Mali
Rebel groups in Burkina Faso
Islamist groups
Jihadist groups